Ramya Nambeesan is an Indian actress and playback singer who appears in Malayalam films.

Films

As actress

Web series

2021 : Navarasa - Segment : Summer of '92 (Haasya - Laughter)
2022 : Kaiyum Kalavum

References

External links
 
 

Actress filmographies
Indian filmographies